Mexican Naval Aviation (FAN), is the naval air arm of the Mexican Navy. The Mexican Navy is divided into two naval fleets: Pacific Ocean and Gulf of Mexico.

History

Naval aviation in Mexico dates back from 1918, when a Mexican-made float biplane was successfully tested by Carlos Santa Ana at the Port of Veracruz, In 1926 a squadron of float-planes were designed and made for the Mexican Navy, but without personnel. Carlos Castillo Breton, became the first Naval pilot in 1927 after training in The U.S. and in Mexico.
Between 1927 and 1943, some aircraft were acquired, and seven naval officers qualified as pilots, some of whom joined the Mexican Air Force. World War II saw the creation of the Naval Aviation school in 1943 at Las Bajadas, Veracruz. These were also ex-FAM aircraft, used to patrol the Gulf of Mexico for German submarines, and were later used for training at the Naval Aviation School.

Years after the war, the role of Mexican Naval Aviation were assigned as supporting the ground and sea naval units in Search & Rescue, coastal patrol and assistance to the general population in case of emergencies or disasters.

1990s
In the 1990s, the Mexican navy started to acquire Russian-built aircraft and helicopters, including the Mil Mi-2, Mil Mi-8 and Antonov An-32B, also purchasing French, U.S. and German-made helicopters and the Finnish-built L-90 Redigo. In 1999 the Mexican navy started a programme to build kit-planes and light helicopters at Las Bajadas, Veracruz.

In 2001 the Mexican naval aviation reported it had 118 aircraft, of which 68 were fixed-wing in 9 squadrons, and 50 helicopters in 9 squadrons, either land-based or on board ocean patrol boats and frigates.

Later purchases were three ex-IDF/AF E-2C Hawkeyes, the first arriving in early July 2004. At the end of the same month, the first two EADS upgraded C212-200 Aviocars flew back to Mexico, with the remaining six being upgraded at BAN Las Bajadas, Mexico. Two AS565 Panther helicopters were purchased for shipborne duties, and delivered in 2005.

Structure
Gulf of Mexico Naval Air Force – HQ in Tuxpan, Veracruz

 Tampico Naval Air Base, Tampico
 1st Air Mobility, Observation and Transport Naval Air Squadron – operating Mil Mi-17, Lancair IV-P
 1st Shipborne Patrol Naval Air Squadron – operating AS565 MB, Bo 105CBS-5, MD902
 Las Bajadas Naval Air Base, Veracruz
 1st Maritime Patrol Naval Air Squadron – operating CASA C-212PM
 1st Early Warning and Reconnaissance Naval Air Squadron – operating E-2C Hawkeye 2000
 Naval Aviation School – operating MD 500, Robinson R22, Schweizer 300, Zlín Z 42
 Campeche Naval Air Base, Campeche
 5th Air Mobility, Observation and Transport Naval Air Squadron – operating Mi-8
 1st Interception and Reconnaissance Naval Air Squadron – operating L-90TP, Sabre 60
 Chetumal Naval Air Base, Chetumal
 1st Patrol Naval Air Squadron – operating Lancair Super ES, MX-7-180A, RC695
 3rd Air Mobility, Observation and Transport Naval Air Squadron – operating Mi-8

Pacific Naval Air Force – HQ in Manzanillo, Colima
 Guaymas Naval Air Base, Guaymas
 1st Interception and Reconnaissance Naval Air Squadron – operating L-90TP, MX-7-180A
 La Paz Naval Air Base, La Paz
 2nd Patrol Naval Air Squadron – operating RC695, Lancair IV-P
 2nd Air Mobility, Observation and Transport Naval Air Squadron – operating Mi-8
 2nd Shipborne Patrol Naval Air Squadron – operating Bo 105CBS-5
 2nd Transport Naval Air Squadron – operating An-32B
 Lázaro Cárdenas Naval Air Base, Lázaro Cárdenas
 2nd Search and Rescue Naval Air Squadron – operating AS555 AF, Mi-2
 Acapulco Naval Air Base, Acapulco
 2nd Search and Rescue Naval Air Squadron – operating AS555 AF, Mi-2
 Salina Cruz Naval Air Base, Salina Cruz
 1st Search and Rescue Naval Air Squadron – operating AS555 AF, Mi-2
 Tapachula Naval Air Base, Tapachula
 4th Patrol Naval Air Squadron – operating Mi-8
 4th Air Mobility, Observation and Transport Naval Air Squadron – operating MX-7-180A, Super Lancair ES

Mexico City Naval Air Base
 1st Transport Naval Air Squadron – operating Gulfstream G450, Learjet 25, Learjet 31, Learjet 60, DHC-8-Q202

Aircraft

Current inventory

See also
Mexican Air Force

References

Mexican Navy
Naval aviation services
Aviation in Mexico